Armando Ribeiro de Aguiar Malda (born 16 January 1971), known simply as Armando, is a Spanish retired footballer who played as a goalkeeper.

He spent most of his 20-year senior career with Cádiz (nine seasons overall, appearing in all three major levels of Spanish football), finishing it with Athletic Bilbao where he played three of his four La Liga campaigns, for a total of 44 matches.

Football career
Armando was born in Sopelana, Biscay. After representing several clubs in the lower leagues, with an unassuming three-year second division spell at Deportivo Alavés, he spent nine years of his career at Cádiz CF, being the second level's Zamora in 2004–05 and first-choice throughout most of the following season's La Liga, as the Andalusians were immediately relegated back.

In January 2008, Cádiz loaned Armando to Athletic Bilbao, which had lost first-choice Gorka Iraizoz for six months due to a knee injury. In an away match against Real Betis on 15 March, he was hit by a bottle thrown by an opposing fan, with his team leading 2–1 and 20 minutes left; he needed six stitches to a wound just inches below the eye, and Athletic were later awarded the win by the Royal Spanish Football Federation.

At the end of the campaign, the loan move was made permanent by the Basques and, with Iraizoz recovered, Armando beat competition from Iñaki Lafuente and served as backup. His only two appearances in 2008–09 were on 28 February 2009 in a 2–1 home loss to Sevilla FC, as manager Joaquín Caparrós rested the entire starting squad for the Copa del Rey semi-final second leg, coincidentally also against Sevilla, and against Real Betis also at San Mamés in a 1–0 success, for the same reason (the upcoming final against FC Barcelona).

Armando retired at the end of 2009–10, having appeared in three matches (two in the cup and the last round of the league). His final appearance – on 15 May 2010 against Racing de Santander – set a record as the club's oldest player in the league, aged 39 years, 119 days. He was immediately appointed to Athletic's coaching staff for the following season.

Personal life
In October 2016, Armando was acting as goalkeeping coach for CD Basconia (Athletic Bilbao's youth farm team) in a match against CD Vitoria in which one of the opposition goalscorers was his son Alain. The young midfielder repeated the feat in the return fixture, in March 2017.

His younger son, Iban, also spent time in Athletic's youth system at Lezama and also played for Danok Bat CF.

References

External links

Stats and bio at Cadistas1910 

1971 births
Living people
People from Mungialdea
Spanish footballers
Footballers from the Basque Country (autonomous community)
Association football goalkeepers
La Liga players
Segunda División players
Segunda División B players
CD Logroñés footballers
Sporting de Gijón B players
Deportivo Alavés players
Barakaldo CF footballers
Cádiz CF players
Athletic Bilbao footballers
Athletic Bilbao non-playing staff
Basque Country international footballers
Bermeo FT footballers
Sportspeople from Biscay